Japanophilia is the obsession of Japanese culture, people and history. The term was first used as early as the 18th century, switching in scope over time. Its opposite is Japanophobia. The study of Japan is Japanology.

Early usage
The term Japanophile traces back to the late 18th and early 19th centuries, which was before Japan became more open to foreign trade. Carl Peter Thunberg and Philipp Franz von Siebold helped introduce Japanese flora, artworks, and other objects to Europe which spiked interest. Lafcadio Hearn, an Irish-Greek author who made his home in Japan in the 19th century, was described as "a confirmed Japanophile" by Charles E. Tuttle Company in their forewords to several of his books. Others may include Jules Brunet, a French Army officer who played a famous role in the Japanese Boshin War.

20th century
In the first decade of the 20th century, several British writers lauded Japan. In 1904, for example, Beatrice Webb wrote that Japan was a "rising star of human self-control and enlightenment", praising the "innovating collectivism" of the Japanese, and the "uncanny" purposefulness and open-mindedness of its "enlightened professional elite." H. G. Wells similarly named the élite of his A Modern Utopia "samurai". In part, this was a result of the decline of British industrial productivity, with Japan and Germany rising comparatively. Germany was seen as a threat and a rival power, but Japan was seen as a potential ally. The British sought efficiency as the solution to issues of productivity, and after the publication of Alfred Stead's 1906 book Great Japan: A Study of National Efficiency, pundits in Britain looked to Japan for lessons. This interest, however, ended after World War I.

General José Millán-Astray, the founder of the Spanish Legion, stated that the samurai warrior code Bushido exerted a great influence on him. Defining Bushido as "a perfect creed", Millán-Astray said that "the Spanish legionnaire is also a samurai and practices the Bushido essentials: Honor, Valor, Loyalty, Generosity, and Sacrifice", and added that Spain would become a great power like Japan by adhering to the code's principles. He also made a Spanish translation of Inazo Nitobe's book Bushido: The Soul of Japan and a prologue to it.

21st century

In the early 2000s, derogatory slang terms were created to refer to people who are obsessed with Japanese popular culture. The term "wapanese" (from "white Japanese", or possibly also "wannabe Japanese") first emerged in 2002 as a derogatory term for a non-Japanese, particularly white, person who is obsessed with Japanese culture, particularly anime and manga. The term "weeaboo" came from the webcomic The Perry Bible Fellowship, in which the word had no meaning other than something unpleasant. According to an unpublished Master of Arts thesis, an administrator on 4chan added a filter on the site to change "wapanese" to "weeaboo," but users on the site quickly picked up the word and applied it in an abusive way in place of the already existing term "wapanese."

A shortened version of the term, "weeb", has also seen increased usage on the Internet in recent years, usually referring to people who are fans of aspects of Japanese pop culture such as anime, visual novels, manga, and light novels. The term "weeb," while originally derogatory, have also been reclaimed by some of those to whom they originally referred, seeing increased usage by fans of Japanese media to refer to themselves in an ironic or self-deprecating fashion. 

Kim Morrissy of the media company Crunchyroll wrote that the use of the word otaku (person with consuming interests) in anime fandom can be hindered by the belief of some Westerners that its use constitutes cultural appropriation and that it can only refer to a Japanese person. 

In a blog post on Anime News Network, Justin Sevakis argued that there is a difference between a weeaboo and someone who simply appreciates Japanese culture, saying that there is nothing wrong with loving Japanese culture, but that a person becomes a weeaboo when they start to be obnoxious, immature, and ignorant about the culture they love. Matt Jardin from the Alaska Dispatch gave his opinion that weeaboos blindly prefer things from Japan while looking down on anything else, despite obvious merit.

See also
 Japanization
 
 Japonisme
Orientalism
 List of Westerners who visited Japan before 1868
 Japanese studies
 Cool Japan
 Japan Expo
 Anime club
 Pacific Movement of the Eastern World
 Sinophile
 Jingri

References

18th-century neologisms
Japan in non-Japanese culture
Japanese nationalism
Japanese subcultures
Orientalism by type
Admiration of foreign cultures